Richard Ernest Nowell Twopeny (1 August 1857 – 2 September 1915) or Twopenny or Turpenny was an Australian rules footballer, journalist and newspaper editor/owner in New Zealand and Australia.

Early life 
Twopeny was the son of Archdeacon Thomas Nowell and Mathilde of Adelaide. He was born in Little Casterton Rectory, Rutland, England in 1857. A brother of Richard was Edward Twopeny. His father migrated to South Australia in 1860.

In 1872 Richard was a student at St Peter's College, Adelaide, and was captain of the school's football team. Twopeny spent part of his childhood in France and was educated at Marlborough College, England, until 1875 and the Ruprecht-Karl-Universität, Heidelberg, Germany.

Twopeny returned to Australia in 1876. He arrived in Melbourne on the Northumberland on 15 May 1876 and soon moved to Adelaide where he worked on the South Australian Register from 1876 to 1877.

Australian rules football

South Australian Football Association (1877) 
Richard Twopeny was a key member of organising the South Australian Football Association in 1877. Along with delegates from Adelaide, Port Adelaide, Willunga, South Park, North Adelaide, Kapunda, Bankers, Gawler, South Adelaide, Victorian, Woodville and Prince Alfred College the rules of the game for the year were set.

Adelaide Football Club (1877) 
In 1877 Twopeny captained the club for 12 matches. He left the club at the end of 1877 to work in Melbourne.

Town Life in Australia 
Twopeny wrote a series of letters that would later be compiled into a book titled Town Life in Australia (1883). It compared the major cities of Australia—at the time Sydney, Melbourne and Adelaide—to each other and to those in the United Kingdom.

The book was hailed by the British Quarterly Review as a welcome change from the “sketches of bush life” that were commonly published about Australia in Britain at the time. The introduction to the 1973 reprint of the book says, “Twopeny reads as freshly today as he ever did.”

L'Australie Méridionale 
As Twopeny studied in Paris, he could write in French; subsequently, he wrote L'Australie Meridionale about life in South Australia.

Exhibition curator 
Twopenny was secretary to the South Australian Commissions to the Paris, Sydney, and Melbourne Exhibitions of 1878, 1879, and 1880, respectively; one of the commissioners from New Zealand to the Melbourne Centennial Exhibition of 1888, and Executive Commissioner for the New Zealand and South Seas Exhibition in 1890.

Journalism 
Twopeny travelled to Europe in 1907; on returning to Melbourne in 1910, he wrote four articles for the Pastoralists' Review on his journey.  Twopeny was editor of the Otago Daily Times from 1882 to 1890, is author of Town Life in Australia and of L'Australie Méridionale, and was the proprietor and editor of the Australian Pastoralist's Review, which he founded in Melbourne in March 1891. He was created an Officier d'Académie in 1879.

Personal life 
Twopenny was married to Mary Josephine, daughter of Rev. Albert Henry Wratislaw, vicar of Manorbier, Pembrokeshire, Wales. They married at St John's Anglican Church, Darlinghurst, Sydney, on 4 December 1879.

Death 
Twopeny died in London on 2 September 1915 of heart disease and pneumonia. He was survived by his wife; there were no children.

References

External links
 
 
 
 Richard Twopeny, Australian Dictionary of Biography 

1857 births
1915 deaths
Australian journalists
19th-century Australian newspaper publishers (people)
Australian newspaper editors
New Zealand editors
New Zealand magazine editors
Australian rules footballers from South Australia
People educated at St Peter's College, Adelaide
People educated at Marlborough College
People from Little Casterton